The Plum Vera Wang dress of Keira Knightley refers to the evening gown worn by British actor Keira Knightley at the 78th Academy Awards on March 5, 2006. The full-length taffeta dress was created by designer Vera Wang and had a single shoulder strap and fishtail skirt. It was accessorised with a Bulgari necklace.

In a subsequent poll by British retail chain Debenhams published in The Daily Telegraph, the dress was voted the 6th greatest red carpet gown of all time. Cosmopolitan magazine also cited it as one of the Best Oscar dresses of all time, saying Knightley looked: "super-graceful in this eggplant taffeta gown custom-made by Vera Wang."

See also
 List of individual dresses
 Green dress of Keira Knightley

References

2000s fashion
Outfits worn at the Academy Awards ceremonies
2006 clothing
2006 in fashion
Vera Wang, Knightley